John Marchi may refer to:
 John J. Marchi (1921–2009), American attorney and jurist 
 John Peter Marchi (1663–1733), Venetian jurist